El reloj de Lucerna (The Clock of Lucerne) is a 3-act zarzuela (drama lírico) by Miguel Marqués for a libretto (in verse) by , dedicated to . It was first staged at the Teatro Apolo in Madrid on 1 March 1884. A modern revival was attempted by Ópera XXI (Spain) in April 2018.

Roles

Background and performance history 
El reloj de Lucerna gained much success. By the end of May 1884 it had been staged for 55 times, while the most popular zarzuela of Teatro Apolo of that season, San Franco de Sena by Emilio Arrieta, was performed for only 34 times.

Synopsis 
The zarzuela is placed in mid-17th century Switzerland.

References

External links 

A synopsis (in Spanish) of the zarzuela at atodazarzuela.blogspot.com

Spanish-language operas
1884 operas
Zarzuelas
Operas by Miguel Marqués
Libretti by Marcos Zapata
Operas set in Switzerland